Norbord Inc. was a Canadian company that manufactured wood-based panels and became the world's largest producer of oriented strand board (OSB). Norbord also manufactured particleboard, medium-density fibreboard (MDF) and related value-added products. Norbord had assets of approximately $1.7 billion and employs approximately 2,600 people at 17 plant locations in the United States, Canada and Europe.

History 
The company was formed as a corporate spin-off of Noranda Mines. Until it was acquired by West Fraser Timber, Norbord was listed on the Toronto Stock Exchange and New York Stock Exchange under the symbol "OSB".

Structure 
Norbord operates 13 OSB mills, 1 MDF (medium density fibreboard) plant, 2 particleboard (chipboard) plants and 1 furniture plant.

Its OSB mills in the US are located in Minnesota, Georgia (2 lines), Mississippi, Alabama, South Carolina and 2 in Texas. In Canada there are 2 mills in Alberta, 1 in British Columbia, 1 in Ontario and 2 in Québec. In Europe there are mills located in Inverness (2 lines) and Cowie (2 lines), Scotland, in South Molton, England as well as in Genk, Belgium.

The MDF line is located in Cowie, Scotland.

Its particleboard lines are located in Cowie, Scotland and South Molton, England.

Norbord's furniture factory is based in South Molton, England.

Both lines in Inverness as well as the line in Genk produce OSB.

In 2016 Norbord announced an expansion of the Inverness facility by addition of a 55m continuous OSB line, expanding production capacity to 750.000 m³/year

References

External links 
Norbord Webpage
Norbord UK Webpage
http://www.norbord.com/about-us/locations

Companies formerly listed on the Toronto Stock Exchange
Pulp and paper companies of Canada